East Poultney is an unincorporated village and census-designated place (CDP) in the town of Poultney, Rutland County, Vermont, United States.

References

Census-designated places in Rutland County, Vermont
Census-designated places in Vermont
Unincorporated communities in Rutland County, Vermont
Unincorporated communities in Vermont